The Plaxton Paramount was a design of coach bodywork built by Plaxton. It first appeared at the 1982 British Motor Show and was built until 1992.

In its more common single deck form it replaced the Supreme V and Viewmaster IV, and was replaced by the Premiere and Excalibur.

Design

Structurally the new Paramount was similar its predecessor the Supreme, utilising 25mm square tubing to form the frame.  The rear end was similar to that used on the Supreme V and VI, but otherwise the styling was entirely new.  The Paramount had a squarer profile than the Supreme, with cleaner lines, a flatter roof line and square-cornered side windows.  The window line at the bottom of the foremost passenger windows (over the front wheelarch) sloped down to meet the deeper windscreen, and immediately aft of this was a small "feature window" (with white screen printing lines) on most bodies.  The feature window was omitted on bodies shorter than 10 metres, and some operators (notably Excelsior of Bournemouth) specified non-standard window spacing without the feature window on longer bodies as well.

The whole structure was treated inside and out to resist rusting.  Although the previous Supreme was of all steel construction, that applied mainly to the actual structure of the coach as the panelling was individual aluminium which can be easily shaped and formed, and easy to replace and featured the Plaxton special flush finish, but aluminium suffers in hot weather from a rippling effect. The Paramount however utilised a continuous steel panel below the windows that was Zintec-coated for corrosion protection, requiring fewer side mountings having been stretched into place and gave a sleeker finish. The front and rear panels used GRP as did many previous Plaxton coach ranges. According to Plaxton brochures the roof was one piece GRP and therefore unlikely to leak, unlike some of the Paramount's competitors.

Initially the Paramount was available in single-deck form only, in two heights, the Paramount 3200 (initially available in 8, 10, 11 and 12-metre lengths) and the high-floor Paramount 3500 (available in 11 and 12-metre lengths, although only three eleven-metre 3500s were built). The figures 3200 and 3500 refer to the height in millimetres.

In 1984 the design was adapted to create the Paramount 4000 double-decker coach, initially built on Neoplan underframes. Neoplan's Skyliner coach had popularised the use of the double-decker coach layout, often with a galley, toilet and other amenities on the lower deck. By comparison the Plaxton design was somewhat more utilitarian, usually more focused on higher capacity than on luxury. Later it was also offered on Scania and DAF chassis.

The Paramount II, the first update to the original single-deck design, was launched in late 1984 for the 1985 season. Externally the mk.II incorporated only minor visual changes; gone was the black full width grille moulding above the headlights, while the small grille between the headlights and the trim around the headlights themselves changed from black to silver.  Mk.II bodies on front-engined Ford R-series chassis retained the mk.I frontal treatment as the large grille was needed to ventilate the radiator.  The chrome strip immediately below the side windows was also made continuous, rather than having a gap to accentuate the small feature window as on the mk.I.  Internal modifications included deeper parcel racks that were capable of supporting air conditioning. A tweed like material was used to cover the interior skirt and a large part of the racks. Some important options were introduced, most notably bonded glazing, alongside the gasket glazing.

Some non-standard Paramount 3200 I bodies built on Quest 80 VM chassis had featured a low driving position, and with the launch of the mk.II this became more generally available as the Paramount 3200 LS and 3500 LS. The driver sat lower in the body so that passengers had a better view ahead, the headlights being closer to the road than usual. The Paramount 3200 LS used the two-piece 3500 windscreen, whereas the 3500 LS had a deeper two-piece windscreen unique to the type. Also new in 1985 was the Paramount 4000 RS, on mid-engined Volvo B10MT chassis. This was a 1½-deck version of the 4000, with a small lower deck saloon at the rear.

In 1986 the Paramount was made available on the Bedford VAS5 midicoach, finally allowing the Supreme range to be retired.  However shortly afterwards Bedford withdrew from the bus market and only eleven VAS5 Paramounts were built.  Although sometimes referred to as Paramount 3200s these bodies were lower in height, as was a one-off body on the unique ACE Puma III.

The Paramount III was launched late in 1986. It introduced still stronger body structures than before and to quote a Plaxtons advert of the time "Progress is Paramount". It had bonded glazing as standard and also featured some more obvious changes to the design, notably the replacement of the original sloping and small "feature windows" with one small pentagonal window immediately behind the cab or door, with Plaxton's "castle" logo being engraved on it (though this was omitted on the shortest 8.5 metre bodies). Changes to the front end consisted of a new grille and bumper, and changes to the shape and angle of the windscreen. The rear window contained a blind like decal at the base with a castle badge in the centre. The dashboard consisted of a moulded cabinet; gone was the Formica and wood of the earlier versions. In the centre of the black finished cabinet was a large "castle" logo. Airline style locker doors were now available on the parcel racks to further give a sleek appearance like a 747.  The Paramount 4000 mk.II double decker remained in production with no external changes, although in 1989 these did receive a mk.III type frontal treatment.

A variant of the Plaxton Paramount III 3500 built to National Express specification on Volvo B10M chassis was named Expressliner. It was fitted with a windowless, moulded plastic rear end featuring an embossed National Express double-N logo. The rear end could be replaced by a standard Paramount rear end when the coach was no longer used for National Express services.

A solitary Mini Paramount was built on a Mercedes-Benz 811D van chassis in 1988.  Like its predecessor the Mini Supreme it was built at Plaxton's southern service centre at Ware rather than the main Scarborough factory.  The sides and rear of the body of similar styling to the larger Paramounts, but it had a standard Mercedes-Benz van bonnet, Supreme IV headlamps and a Mini Supreme windscreen. Only one was built, as the Beaver minibus body made by Plaxton's Reeve Burgess subsidiary could be sold at a more competitive price.

Chassis
Sales of Paramount bodies reflected changes in the UK coach market during the 1980s-90s, which was moving away from lightweight chassis to higher-specification heavyweight coaches.  Whereas only around 30% of Paramount Is were the high-floor 3500 version, this rose to 34% of Paramount IIs and 55% of Paramount IIIs. The proportion of bodies built to the maximum permitted length of 12 metres also climbed steadily, from 66% of Paramount Is to 74% of Paramount IIs and 91% of Paramount IIIs.  Lightweight Ford and Bedford chassis accounted for 23% of Paramount Is, but these were discontinued in 1985 and 1987 respectively leaving this segment to the mediumweight Dennis Javelin which accounted for only 11% of Paramounts from the 1988 season onwards.  Rear-engined chassis were always greatly outsold by the mid-engined types, but slowly increased as a proportion of Paramount chassis from just 2% of 1983 season bodies to over 12% of the 1991 season output.

The Paramount was built on the following chassis types, listed by quantity built:

Mini Paramount
 Mercedes-Benz 811D (1)

Paramount 3200 and 3500
Volvo B10M (1817)
Leyland Tiger (1433)
Bedford Y series (580)
DAF MB200 and MB230 (335)
Dennis Javelin (225)
DAF SB2005, SB2300 and SB2305 (221)
Scania K series (171)
Ford R-Series (140)
Leyland Royal Tiger (37)
Leyland Leopard (34, mostly rebodies)
Dennis Dorchester (33)
DAF SB3000 (26)
Mercedes-Benz O303 (26)
Quest 80 VM (17)
Volvo B58 (15, all rebodies)
Bedford VAS5 (11)
Ward Dalesman (6)
ACE Puma IV (4)
ACE Puma III (1)

Paramount 4000
Auwärter (Neoplan) N722/3 (30)
DAF SBR3000 (24)
Volvo B10MT (23)
Scania K series (22)

Body numbering
From the 1982 to 1988 build seasons, Plaxton's body numbering system used three character codes to identify the body style. The following codes were used for the Paramount:

P1C Paramount I 3200
P1X Paramount I 3200 Express
H1C Paramount I 3500
H1X Paramount I 3500 Express
P2C Paramount II 3200
P2X Paramount II 3200 Express
H2C Paramount II 3500
H2X Paramount II 3500 Express
P3C Paramount III 3200
P3X Paramount III 3200 Express
H3C Paramount III 3500
D1C Paramount 4000
D2C Paramount II 4000 or 4000RS

The "Express" suffix identifies the variant with a wider entrance and two-piece door. Examples of H1X, H2X and P3X are rare.

Since the 1989 build season, Plaxton's body numbering system has used a letter to identify the body style. The following letters were used for the Paramount III:

A Paramount III 3200
B Paramount III 3500
C Paramount 4000
D Paramount 4000RS

Gallery

References

Paramount
Coaches (bus)
Double-decker buses